A list of chapters of Lambda Theta Phi Latin Fraternity Inc. In total, there are 119 Undergraduate chapters, 29 Undergraduate Associate chapters, 29 Alumni Entities, totaling 182 entities throughout the United States.

Undergraduate chapters
Active chapters are indicated in bold. Inactive chapters are indicated in italic

Associate chapters
Active chapters are indicated in bold. Inactive chapters are indicated in italic

Alumni chapters

External links 
Lambda Theta Phi National Website

chapters
Lists of chapters of United States student societies by society
Hispanic and Latino organizations